Joachim Murat (also  , ; ; 25 March 1767 – 13 October 1815) was a French military commander and statesman who served during the French Revolutionary Wars and Napoleonic Wars. Under the French Empire he received the military titles of Marshal of the Empire and Admiral of France. 

He was the 1st Prince Murat, Grand Duke of Berg from 1806 to 1808 and King of Naples as Joachim-Napoleon from 1808 to 1815. He was the brother-in-law of Napoleon Bonaparte.

Early life
Murat was born on 25 March 1767 in La Bastide-Fortunière (later renamed Labastide-Murat after him), in Guyenne (the present-day French department of Lot). His father was Pierre Murat-Jordy (d. 27 July 1799), an affluent yeoman, innkeeper, postmaster and churchwarden. His mother was Jeanne Loubières (1722 – 11 March 1806), the daughter of Pierre Loubières and his wife Jeanne Viellescazes.

Murat's father, Pierre Murat-Jordy,  was the son of Guillaume Murat (1692–1754) and his wife Marguerite Herbeil (d. 1755), the paternal grandson of Pierre Murat (b. 1634) and his wife Catherine Badourès (d. 1697), and the maternal grandson of Bertrand Herbeil and his wife Anne Roques.

Murat's parents intended that he pursue a vocation in the church. He was taught by the parish priest, after which he won a place at the College of Saint-Michel at Cahors when he was ten years old.  He then entered the seminary of the Lazarists at Toulouse. When a regiment of cavalry passed through the city in 1787, he ran away and enlisted on 23 February 1787 in the Chasseurs des Ardennes, which the following year became known as the Chasseurs de Champagne, or the 12th Chasseurs. In 1789, an affair forced him to resign, and he returned to his family, becoming a clerk to a haberdasher at Saint-Ceré.

French Revolutionary Wars

By 1790, Murat had joined the National Guard. The Canton of Montaucon sent him as its representative to the celebration of the first anniversary of Bastille Day (la Fête nationale). He was reinstated in his former regiment. Because part of the 12th Chasseurs had been sent to Montmédy to protect the royal family on its flight to Varennes, the regiment had to defend its honour and loyalty to the Republic. Murat and the regiment's adjutant made a speech to the assembly at Toul to that effect.  

In 1792, Murat joined the Constitutional Guard, but left it that same year. His departure was attributed to various causes, including his constant quarreling and dueling, although he claimed he left to avoid punishment for being absent without leave.

An ardent Republican, Murat wrote to his brother in 1791 stating he was preoccupied with revolutionary affairs and would sooner die than cease to be a patriot. Upon his departure from the Constitutional Guard, he reported to the Committee of Surveillance of the Constitutional Assembly that the Guard was guilty of treason and that his lieutenant colonel, a man named Descours, had encouraged him to serve in the émigré army of Louis Joseph, Prince of Condé, then stationed in Koblenz. This garnered for him the support of the Republicans. Murat rejoined his former regiment and was promoted to corporal in April, and later to sergeant in May.  

By 19 November 1792, Murat was 25 years old and elated at his latest promotion. As a sous-lieutenant, he thought, his family must recognise that he had no great propensity for the priesthood, and he was hoping to prove that he had not been wrong in wishing to be a soldier. Two of the ministers had accused him of being an aristocrat, confusing him with the noble family of Murat d'Auvergne, an accusation that continued to haunt him for the next several years.

13 Vendémiaire

In the autumn of 1795, two years after King Louis XVI of France had been guillotined, royalists and counter-revolutionaries organised an armed uprising. On 3 October, General Napoleon Bonaparte, who was stationed in Paris, was named commander of the French National Convention's defending forces. Bonaparte tasked Murat, who had offered himself voluntarily, with the gathering of artillery from a suburb outside the control of the government's forces.

Murat managed to take the cannons of the Camp des Sablons and transport them to the centre of Paris while avoiding the rioters. The use of these cannons – the famous "whiff of grapeshot" – on 5 October allowed Bonaparte to save the members of the National Convention. Napoleon’s later report did not mention Murat. Napoleon did not forget him, as Murat was made a marshal, the "First Horseman of Europe", Grand Duke of Berg and King of Naples.

Italian and Egyptian campaigns

In 1796 Joachim Murat went with Bonaparte to northern Italy, initially as his aide-de-camp, and was later named commander of the cavalry during the many campaigns against the Austrians and their allies.

Murat commanded the cavalry of the French Egyptian expedition of 1798, again under Bonaparte. On 25 July 1799 at the Battle of Abukir, he successfully led the cavalry charge that broke the Ottoman line. 

In 1799, some remaining staff officers, including Murat, and Bonaparte returned to France, eluding various British fleets in five frigates. A short while later, Murat played an important, even pivotal, role in Bonaparte's "coup within a coup" of 18 Brumaire (9 November 1799), when he first assumed political power.

Murat married Caroline Bonaparte, with whom he shared the same birthday, in a civil ceremony on 20 January 1800 at Mortefontaine and in a religious ceremony on 4 January 1802 in Paris, thus becoming a son-in-law of Letizia Ramolino as well as brother-in-law to Napoleon Bonaparte, Joseph Bonaparte, Lucien Bonaparte, Elisa Bonaparte, Louis Bonaparte, Pauline Bonaparte and Jérôme Bonaparte.

Napoleonic Wars

Napoleon made Murat a Marshal of the Empire on 18 May 1804, and granted him the title of "First Horseman of Europe". He was made Prince of the Empire and Admiral of the Empire in 1805, despite having very little knowledge about naval warfare. He fought in various battles, during 1805-1807, including Ulm, Austerlitz, Jena and Eylau, where he led a famous cavalry charge against the Russians.

After several territorial concessions made by Prussia, the Grand Duchy of Berg was set up, he was appointed Grand Duke of Berg and Duke of Cleves on 15 March 1806, and held this title until 1 August 1808, when he was named King of Naples. Murat was in charge of the French Army in Madrid when the popular Dos de Mayo Uprising that started the Peninsular War broke out.

Murat proved to be equally useful in the Russian campaign of 1812, where he distinguished himself as the best cavalry commander of the Grande Armee at battles such as Smolensk and Borodino.

Although he was a great horseman, Murat showed a total lack of concern for the well-being of the horses. Napoleon had created the greatest forage problem known in military history by putting together a cavalry of 40,000 men and horses. The long marches and the lack of rest meant that the horses suffered from hunger, bad fodder, saddle sores and exhaustion, but these factors were aggravated by Murat himself. He also failed to forge caulkin shoes for the horses to enable them in the retreat to traverse roads that had become iced over. The Polish cavalry and Caulaincourt knew this and acted accordingly.

He continued to serve Napoleon during the German Campaign of 1813. Following Napoleon's defeat at the Battle of Leipzig, Murat reached a secret agreement with the Allies in order to save his own throne and switched sides to the Coalition.

In March 1815, he declared war on Austria in the proclamation to Italian patriots in Rimini, moved north to fight against the Austrians in the Neapolitan War in order to strengthen his rule in Italy by military means. He was defeated by Austrian general Frederick Bianchi at the Battle of Tolentino (2–3 May 1815).

Death
Murat fled to Corsica and then to Pizzo. Soon he was captured by forces of King Ferdinand IV of Naples. He was tried for treason and sentenced to death by firing squad.

Coats of arms

Children

Murat and Caroline had four children:
 Achille Charles Louis Napoléon Murat, Hereditary Prince of Berg, Prince of Naples, 2nd Prince Murat (Paris, 21 January 1801 – Jefferson County, Florida, 15 April 1847), m. Tallahassee, Florida, 12 July 1826 Catherine Daingerfield Willis (near Fredericksburg, Virginia, 17 August 1803 – Tallahassee, Florida, 7 August 1867), daughter of Colonel Byrd C. Willis (29 August 1781 – 1846) and wife Mary Lewis, and great-grandniece of George Washington, without issue
  (Paris, 26 April 1802 – Bologna, 12 March 1859), m. Venice, 27 October 1823 Guido Taddeo Pepoli, Marchese Pepoli, Conte di Castiglione (Bologna, 7 September 1789 – Bologna, 2 March 1852), and had issue
 Lucien Charles Joseph Napoléon Murat, 2nd Sovereign Prince of Pontecorvo, 3rd Prince Murat (Milan, 16 May 1803 – Paris, 10 April 1878), m. Bordentown, New Jersey, 18 August 1831 Caroline Georgina Fraser (Charleston, South Carolina, 13 April 1810 – Paris, 10 February 1879), daughter of Thomas Fraser and wife Anne Lauton, and had issue; he was an associate of his first cousin Napoleon III of France. Ancestor of René Auberjonois
 Princess Louise Julie Caroline Murat (Paris, 21 March 1805 – Ravenna, 1 December 1889), m. Trieste, 25 October 1825  (Ravenna, 19 February 1787 – Florence, 19 July 1876) and had issue.

Relatives
Murat had a brother named Pierre (La Bastide-Fortunière, 27 November 1748 – La Bastide-Fortunière, 8 October 1792), who married at La Bastide-Fortunière on 26 February 1783 Louise d'Astorg (La Bastide-Fortunière, 23 October 1762 – 31 May 1832), daughter of Aymeric d'Astorg, born in 1721, and wife Marie Alanyou, paternal granddaughter of Antoine d'Astorg, born 18 November 1676, and wife Marie de Mary (4 May 1686 – 7 October 1727) and maternal granddaughter of Jean Alanyou and wife Louise de Valon. 

Pierre and Louise were the parents of Marie Louise, Pierre Adrien (d. 1805), Marie Radegonde (d. 1800), Thomas Joachim and Marie Antoinette Murat, whom Emperor Napoleon I arranged to marry Charles, Prince of Hohenzollern-Sigmaringen; Karl III and Marie were the parents of Charles Anthony, Prince of Hohenzollern from whom descended Stephanie of Hohenzollern-Sigmaringen Queen of Portugal; her brother Carol I of Romania and her nephew Albert I of Belgium.

Another descendant of note is his great-great-great-grandson, American actor René Auberjonois.

Notes

References

See also
 Monumento a los Caídos por España (Madrid)

Further reading
 
 Potocka-Wąsowiczowa, Anna z Tyszkiewiczów. Wspomnienia naocznego świadka. Warszawa: Państwowy Instytut Wydawniczy, 1965.

External links

  "Murat," in Naples Encyclopedia.
 Friends of the Musée Murat

|-

of the First French Empire

 
1767 births
1815 deaths
19th-century monarchs of Naples
19th-century executions by Italy
Admirals of France
Military governors of Paris
Burials at Père Lachaise Cemetery
Cavalry commanders
Executed monarchs
Executed people from Midi-Pyrénées
French people executed abroad
Grand Dukes of Berg and Cleves
Knights of the Golden Fleece of Spain
Marshals of the First French Empire
Members of the Corps législatif
Members of the Sénat conservateur
Joachim
Occitan people
People executed by Italy by firing squad
People executed by the Kingdom of Naples
People from Lot (department)
Politicians from Occitania (administrative region)
Joachim
Names inscribed under the Arc de Triomphe
People of the Kingdom of Naples (Napoleonic)